The 1986 Baden-Württemberg motorcycle Grand Prix was an additional event for 80cc, 125cc and sidecar classes that counted towards the 1986 Motorcycle Grand Prix season. It took place on the weekend of 28 September 1986 at the Hockenheimring, in the German state of Baden-Württemberg.

125 cc Classification

80 cc Classification

Sidecar Classification

Notes

It was Angel Nieto final race in 125cc class and in overall class

References

German motorcycle Grand Prix
Baden-Wurttemberg
Baden-Wurttemberg
Baden-Wurttemberg motorcycle Grand Prix